Janne Kumpulainen (born March 12, 1991) is a Finnish professional ice hockey left winger currently playing for KeuPa HT in Mestis.

Kumpulainen previously played in Liiga for Jukurit, playing 46 games for the team between 2016 and 2018.

References

External links

1991 births
Living people
Les Aigles de Nice players
Finnish ice hockey left wingers
Iisalmen Peli-Karhut players
Imatran Ketterä players
JYP-Akatemia players
KeuPa HT players
Mikkelin Jukurit players
SaPKo players
Sportspeople from Jyväskylä
JYP Jyväskylä players
21st-century Finnish people